Josh and S.A.M. is a 1993 American road comedy-drama film starring Noah Fleiss (in his film debut), Jacob Tierney, and Martha Plimpton. The film is about two young brothers who run away from home due to emotional conflict over the divorce of their parents. It was directed by Billy Weber and produced by Martin Brest.

Plot 
Twelve-year-old Josh Whitney unintentionally brainwashes his younger brother, seven-year-old Sam, making Sam believe that he is a genetically designed child warrior. Josh says that Sam is actually an acronym, and that he is a "Strategically Altered Mutant" that was designed by the government to fight in a secret war in Africa. After a series of various suspicious coincidences in Josh's lies, Sam eventually believes that he is a S.A.M.

Josh says that he can be safely deactivated and turned back into a human if he reaches Canada. After a thunderstorm grounds their flight in Dallas, forcing them to stay in a hotel, Josh grows impatient with his mother and decides to abandon Sam and his life. Blocked at all exits by hotel officials, he heads into a high-school reunion to seek refuge. He lies that his mother was a graduate, and he finds Derek Baxter, a drunken man claiming to be his father. Before Josh has time to clear his lie, Sam appears, and shortly thereafter, Derek drives them to their "grandparents'" house to tell them the good news. Upon entering the house, Derek overreacts to a picture of the real family and goes after Josh. After Sam hits him with a cue ball, Josh reacts defensively and hits Derek on the head with a pool cue, supposedly "killing" him. In panic, the two brothers steal his rental car and begin their trek to Canada.

After a day of Josh and Sam taking turns driving, they encounter Allison, who is an older teen runaway from Hannibal, Missouri. They pick her up due to a resemblance to the Liberty Maid, another lie of Josh's. According to the Liberty Maid's description, she aids fleeing S.A.M.s to Canada, in the similar way of Harriet Tubman. Allison travels with the brothers as their driver, and during the run develops a bond with Josh. After a run-in with a cop outside of Salt Lake City, Sam flees, causing a chase through the desert that nearly kills Sam as he crawls under a train. After Josh and Allison reach the car, they dash to the road to continue their journey.

During a night stop in a motel, Sam decides to leave Josh and Allison, and he steals the car. Later that day, Josh and Alison part ways after she fails to convince him to live in Seattle with her. After a long walk, he discovers the car on the side of the road. Unfortunately, Sam is not there, but he discovers a bus stop nearby and rides it the rest of the way to Canada. On the bus, he sees Sam riding on the back of a tractor-trailer, and after Sam and he reunite, they walk across the border into Canada.

In Calgary, Canada, Josh tries several attempts to return his brother back to "normal". Among these attempts is a trip to a tanning booth explaining that it will "deactivate him." After this, Sam is sent back home to Orlando on a plane. Feeling unwanted at home and considering himself a fugitive, Josh stays behind. When Sam arrives in Orlando, he is picked up by their dad, Thom, who asks about Josh's whereabouts, and tells Sam that he went to Dallas and talked to the police. They told him that Derek was knocked unconscious by Josh. The next morning, Josh arrives home in a taxi and reunites with Sam. As they walk inside, Sam tells Josh that he found a big file in his Dad's office...about Josh.

Cast 
 Jacob Tierney as Joshua "Josh" Whitney
 Noah Fleiss as Samuel "Sam" / "Killer Sam" Whitney
 Stephen Tobolowsky as Thomas "Thom" Whitney
 Joan Allen as Caroline Whitney LaTourette
 Chris Penn as Derek Baxter
 Martha Plimpton as Alison (The Liberty Maid)
 Maury Chaykin as Pizza Man
 Udo Kier as Tanning Salon Manager
 Ronald Guttman as Jean-Pierre "J.P." LaTourette
 Ann Hearn as Teacher
 Anne Lange as Ellen Coleman Whitney 
 Sean Baca as Curtis Coleman
 Jake Gyllenhaal as Leon Coleman
 Amy Wright as Waitress
 Brent Hinkley as Bill at Reunion

Production 
Principal photography began on August 3, 1992. Filming locations include Billings, Montana, Laurel, Montana, and along Highway 3 in Yellowstone County. Other parts of the film were shot in Salt Lake City, Arches National Park, Highway 191, Lisbon Valley, and Spanish Valley in Utah. & Calgary, Canada. Filming lasted for 69 days and concluded on October 11, 1992.

Release 
The film premiered on November 24, 1993, at Planet Hollywood in New York City. Jacob Tierney, Noah Fleiss, and their families attended the premiere, but none of the other actors and none of the crew members attended it.

Reception 
The film received negative reviews from critics. It received a rating of 25% on Rotten Tomatoes, based on eight reviews.

References

External links 
 
 
 
 
 

1993 films
1990s coming-of-age comedy-drama films
1990s road comedy-drama films
American coming-of-age comedy-drama films
American road comedy-drama films
Castle Rock Entertainment films
Columbia Pictures films
Fictional duos
New Line Cinema films
Films scored by Thomas Newman
Films shot in Utah
1993 directorial debut films
1990s English-language films
1990s American films